Jacques Grimonpon (30 July 1925  – 23 January 2013) was a French football defender.

He was called up for 1954 FIFA World Cup but never played for France.

He played for Lille OSC, Le Havre AC, Lyon OU/Olympique Lyonnais, FC Girondins de Bordeaux.

References

1925 births
2013 deaths
Sportspeople from Tourcoing
French footballers
Association football defenders
Ligue 1 players
Ligue 2 players
Lille OSC players
Olympique Lyonnais players
Le Havre AC players
FC Girondins de Bordeaux players
1954 FIFA World Cup players
Footballers from Hauts-de-France